Robert L. Summerlin (1858–1926) was an American judge and politician, and the fifth Mayor of Orlando in the years 1885 to 1892. Read History Bench & Bar Southern California 1909 law reference included for true dates.

Summerlin was the son of Frances "Fannie" Knight Summerlin (1823–1896) and Jacob Summerlin (1820–1893). His father was known as the "Cattle King of Florida" named Lake Eola and built a house next to it. Jacob loaned money to Orange County, enabling it to keep the county seat in Orlando; Summerlin Avenue in Downtown Orlando is named after him. Robert Summerlin received his law degree from University of Georgia in 1875 and in 1880 served as Mayor of Orlando for 1885-1892 (Histo Bench & Bar Southern California 1909). Summerlin married Texas B. Parker in 1876 in Polk County, Florida, with whom he had two daughters in 1880. The couple divorced before 1883.

Robert later married Elisabeth Templeman van der Hoeven in San Antonio where he practiced law for several years. Robert and Elizabeth had four sons and Thomas George Arthur moved to Los Angeles with their father early 1900s. Judge Robert Summerlin practiced law for many years in Los Angeles.
Robert and Thomas moved to Los Angeles in the early 1900s. George and Arthur followed. (As did Elizabeth Vander Hoeven Summerlin, after their divorce to join her family.)

Late in life he married again in 1901 to a woman named Anita. The couple had no children. Anita lived in San Antonio much of time while Robert lived near 3 of his sons in Los Angeles.
One son lived in Springfield, MA.

Galveston, Texas  Anita Barbeck later in Robert's life.

References

History of the Bench & Bar of Southern California, 1909 by Willoughby Rodman,
Texas, Florida, California census, 
US passport applications
Headstone in Los Angeles

1858 births
1926 deaths
Florida lawyers
Mayors of Orlando, Florida
People from Tampa, Florida
University of Georgia alumni
19th-century American lawyers